The 1868 United States presidential election in Indiana took place on November 3, 1868, as part of the 1868 United States presidential election. Voters chose 13 representatives, or electors to the Electoral College, who voted for president and vice president.

Indiana voted for the Republican nominee, Ulysses S. Grant, over the Democratic nominee, Horatio Seymour. Grant won the state by a narrow margin of 2.78%.

Results

See also
 United States presidential elections in Indiana

References

Indiana
1868
1868 Indiana elections